Sun Metro Mass Transit Department, simply known as Sun Metro, is the public transportation provider that serves El Paso, Texas. Consisting of buses and paratransit service, it is a department of the City of El Paso, and the agency also serves the rest of El Paso County. The major hub is located at the Bert Williams Downtown Santa Fe Transfer Center in the surrounding block areas in Downtown El Paso.

History 
Until 1987, Sun Metro was called Sun City Area Transit (SCAT).

The agency was headquartered at the historic Union Depot in downtown El Paso until 2014, when it opened a new  facility along Montana Avenue southeast of El Paso International Airport.

Facilities 
 Bert Williams Downtown Santa Fe Transfer Center, 601 Santa Fe St.
 Al Jefferson Westside Transfer Center, 7535 Remcon Cir.
 Arturo Tury Benavides Cielo Vista Transit Center, 1165 Sunmount Dr.
 Rorbert E. McKee Five Points Transit Center, 2830 Montana Ave.
 Transit Operations Center, 10151 Montana Ave.
 LIFT Facility, 5081 Fred Wilson Ave.
 Arves E. Jones Sr. Northgate Transit Center, 9348 Dyer St.
 Union Plaza Transit Terminal, 400 W. San Antonio Ave.
 Nestor A. Valencia Mission Valley Transit Center, 9065 Alameda Ave.
 Glory Road Transit Center, 100 E. Glory Road

Services

Brio 

Sun Metro began operating its express bus service, named Brio, on October 27, 2014, serving the Mesa Street corridor (part of State Highway 20) between Downtown El Paso and the Westside Transfer Center in Northwest El Paso. The frequency of Brio buses range from 10 minutes during weekday rush hours to 15 minutes mid-day from Monday to Friday, and 20 minutes on Saturdays; buses do not run on Sundays or holidays. The line uses 22 purpose-built curbside stations with shelters, ticket vending machines for pre-boarding payment, and real-time arrival information. The  route runs in mixed traffic, but does use transit signal priority. The Brio fleet consists of  branded New Flyer Xcelsior articulated buses powered by compressed natural gas, able to carry 72 total passengers and feature on-board WiFi, interior bike racks, and passenger information monitors. The project cost $27.1 million to implement, using local funds and a Federal Transit Administration grant.

Sun Metro plans to open its second Brio route in 2018, extending the system to Mission Valley via Alameda Avenue at a cost of $35.5 million. Further routes on Dyer Street and Montana Avenue are planned, with the former beginning construction as early as 2017.

El Paso Streetcar 

The El Paso Streetcar is a streetcar system in El Paso, Texas, that opened for service on November 9, 2018, and uses a fleet of restored PCC streetcars that had served the city's previous system until its closure in 1974. The system was constructed under the authority of the Camino Real Regional Mobility Authority, but when the major construction was completed, around spring 2018, it was transferred to Sun Metro, for operation and maintenance. , construction of the system was projected to cost $97 million.

Fleet

Active

See also 

 Streetcars in North America

References

External links 
 

Bus transportation in Texas
Transportation in El Paso, Texas